Soranathota Divisional Secretariat is a  Divisional Secretariat  of Badulla District, of Uva Province, Sri Lanka.

References
 Divisional Secretariats Portal

Divisional Secretariats of Badulla District